Masataka Takayama may refer to:

, Japanese boxer
, Japanese photographer